Restoration is a 1995 American historical drama film directed by Michael Hoffman. It stars Robert Downey Jr. as a 17th-century medical student exploited by King Charles II. The film, which is based on the 1989 novel of the same title by Rose Tremain, was filmed in Wales and won the Academy Awards for art direction and costume design.

Plot
A young doctor, Robert Merivel, enters the service of King Charles II of England after having saved the King's favorite spaniel. Merivel finds himself enjoying a life of debauched pleasure and popularity at court, until the King informs him that he has arranged for Merivel to wed Celia, the King's favorite mistress. The purpose of the arranged marriage is to fool another of the King's mistresses. Merivel is given an estate named Bidnold in Suffolk, and Celia is installed in a house in Kew where the king can visit her secretly. Merivel lives a life of debauchery there, but also finds pleasure in restoring the house to its former beauty with the support of Will Gates, the man who runs the estate. However, things become complicated when Merivel breaks the King's cardinal rule by falling in love with Celia. Elias Finn, a painter commissioned by the King to paint a portrait of Celia, tricks Merivel into revealing his romantic feelings for Celia, who does not return Merivel's affections. After finding out about Merivel's romantic feelings toward Celia, the King banishes him from court back to his life as a physician.

Merivel rejoins his old friend, John Pearce, who has opened a Quaker sanitarium. There, Merivel meets Katherine, a troubled young woman whose husband walked out on her after their daughter drowned in the river. Merivel and Katherine become lovers. Pearce falls fatally ill with consumption, and while Merivel is tending to his dying friend, they discover that Katherine is pregnant with Merivel's child. After the death of Pearce, Merivel and Katherine leave.

The pair returns to London just as the Great Plague has hit. Katherine gives birth to a daughter, Margaret, via Caesarean section, but dies in the process as there is no way to ward off infection once the body has been cut open. In her dying moments, Merivel promises Katherine that he loves her, and will care for Margaret.

As the plague continues to kill the people of London, Merivel feels compelled to do what he can as a physician. He leaves Margaret with a wet nurse who promises to care for her in his absence, and goes out into the city, separating the sick from the well, who have all been quarantined together, and does what he can to ease the suffering of the dying. When someone asks for Merivel's name, he says he is John Pearce, as a tribute to his friend. Under this misnomer and in disguise, Merivel is once again summoned to the palace. The King fears that Celia has contracted the plague. Merivel soon assures him that she does not have the plague, but rather has a treatable fever and is with child. With this, Merivel realizes the life he has now is more rewarding and fulfilling than the life and loves at the court he left behind.

Suddenly, the court is notified that the city is ablaze, and Merivel races back to the city to retrieve his infant daughter from the flames. He is unable to find her, and falling through burning wood, Merivel lands in a small row boat, unconscious, and is floated by the river current away from the city. When he awakens, he is being cared for by Will Gates back at Bidnold. As Merivel recovers from his fall, he cannot recover from his failure to protect his young daughter from harm, when suddenly the King arrives at the house with his entourage. He informs Merivel that he has discovered the doctor's true identity, and that he was impressed with the man Merivel had become. With that, the King steps aside to reveal a nurse holding Margaret safely in her arms. For his courage and good work done in treating the victims of the plague, the King once again gives Bidnold to Merivel, stating that this time it will never be taken away. The film ends with Merivel returning to London, to set up a new hospital with help from the King.

Cast

Reception
Restoration won Academy Awards for Best Art Direction-Set Decoration for Eugenio Zanetti and Best Costume Design for James Acheson. The film was also entered into the 46th Berlin International Film Festival. The site's critics consensus reads, "Restoration spins an engaging period yarn out of its bestselling source material, brought to life through the efforts of an eclectic ensemble cast led by Robert Downey Jr." At Metacritic, the film has a weighted average score of 66 out of 100 based on 16 critics, indicating "generally favorable reviews".

Peter Travers, in a favorable review for Rolling Stone, praised the film for its timely AIDS parable and described Ryan as miscast in the role of the troubled Katherine. In her review for The New York Times, Janet Maslin wrote, "Restoration crams in more research and period detail than it can comfortably digest, but its story is not overwhelmed by such overkill".

Rose Tremain, author of the novel on which the film was based, said of the film that it had a beautiful texture to it. She was however disappointed with the film's storytelling, and said the story has no logic and so does not move the audience. The disappointment led her to take up scriptwriting herself.

Soundtrack

Composer James Newton Howard's main theme is based on the music from The Fairy-Queen by Henry Purcell.

Track listing
 "If Love's A Sweet Passion (From the Fairy Queen)" 1:31
 "Main Titles" 2:57
 "Frost Dance In C (From King Arthur)" 1:34
 "A Night With Lulu" 1:21
 "Minuet In G (From Abdelazer)" 0:53
 "Here The Deities Approve (From the Ode welcome to all the Pleasures)" 2:28
 "A Creature Of The New Age" 1:09
 "Overture In D (From the Fairy Queen)" 1:26
 "The Wedding" 1:39
 "Hornpipe In D Minor (From the Fairy Queen)" 1:26
 "Arrival In Bidnold" 1:08
 "The Cabinet Of Curiosities" 2:54
 "The Land Of Mar" 1:11
 "The Lie" 1:19
 "A New Ground (In E Minor)" 0:52
 "Merivel Woos Celia" 2:26
 "Katharine Sleeps" 3:23
 "Taking Bidnold Back" 1:35
 "Muzette 1 In A Minor (From 3e Livre De Pieces De Viole)" 2:56
 "The Right Knowledge" 2:06
 "The Plague" 2:09
 "Katharine's Death" 4:37
 "Night Sweats" 3:03
 "Hospital" 2:54
 "Doctor Merivel" 1:50
 "Listening To Celia's Heart" 1:39
 "The Fire" 3:18
 "Allegro From Sinfonia (Act II) (From the Indian Queen)" 1:19
 "Your Child I Believe" 1:13
 "Newcastle (Traditional)" 0:38
 "2nd Overture In D (From King Arthur)" 1:27

References

External links
 
 
 
 

1995 films
Films set in the 1660s
Films set in the 1670s
1995 drama films
Films based on British novels
Films whose art director won the Best Art Direction Academy Award
Films shot in Wales
Films set in England
Films set in London
Films directed by Michael Hoffman
Films scored by James Newton Howard
Films that won the Best Costume Design Academy Award
Films about infectious diseases
Cultural depictions of Charles II of England
1990s English-language films
American historical drama films
1990s American films